Solo is a documentary film, directed and produced by Olga Pankratova. It follows six dancers, who each have a story, in six different dance genres. Classical ballet, vogue (dance), contemporary, hip-hop, pole dance, and Krump. The film had its world premiere on February 14, 2022, at the renowned Karo 11 October in Moscow, Russia. Distribution rights for Russia/CIS were acquired by Russia World Vision (RWV) on December 19, 2021., and on April 16, 2022, North American streaming and DVD rights were acquired by MVD Entertainment Group.

Cast 

 Mikhail Kryuchkov
 Alena Bonchinche
 Alexey Torgunakov
 Kristy
 Dmitry Politov
 Lady Whiphead

Production 
In 2014, Olga Pankratova won the Audience Award at Moscow State University for the short film Solo. The film was supported by the Ministry of Culture (Russia), Studio Mao, DA Records, and Canon Inc.

The film's score was composed by Andre Prilepsky.

Filming 
Principal photography started in 2018 in Russia, France, Germany, and Poland.

References

External links 

 
 Solo TV Interview

2022 documentary films
Russian documentary films